The A4054 is an A Road connecting Llandaff, Cardiff with Merthyr Tydfil in Wales and mostly follows the former route of the A470.

Settlements on route
Settlements served by the road include:
Llandaff
Llandaff North
Whitchurch
Coryton
Tongwynlais
Taff's Well
Rhydyfelin
Treforest
Pontypridd
Abercynon
Quakers Yard
Merthyr Vale
Troedyrhiw
Pentrebach
Merthyr Tydfil
Cefn-Coed-y-Cymmer

Sources
 OS 1:25000 (as accessed via Bing Maps)

Roads in Cardiff
Roads in Rhondda Cynon Taf
Roads in Merthyr Tydfil